Stavropolsky District is an administrative and municipal district (raion), one of the twenty-seven in Samara Oblast, Russia. It is located in the west of the oblast. Its administrative center is the city of Tolyatti (which is not administratively a part of the district). Population: 54,181 (2010 Census);

Administrative and municipal status
Within the framework of administrative divisions, Stavropolsky District is one of the twenty-seven in the oblast. The city of Tolyatti serves as its administrative center, despite being incorporated separately as a town of oblast significance—an administrative unit with the status equal to that of the districts.

As a municipal division, the district is incorporated as Stavropolsky Municipal District. The city of oblast significance of Tolyatti is incorporated separately from the district as Tolyatti Urban Okrug.

References

Notes

Sources

Districts of Samara Oblast

